Optical depth in astrophysics refers to a specific level of transparency.  Optical depth and actual depth,  and  respectively, can vary widely depending on the absorptivity of the astrophysical environment.  Indeed,  is able to show the relationship between these two quantities and can lead to a greater understanding of the structure inside a star.

Optical depth is a measure of the extinction coefficient or absorptivity up to a specific 'depth' of a star's makeup.

 

The assumption here is that either the extinction coefficient  or the column number density  is known.  These can generally be calculated from other equations if a fair amount of information is known about the chemical makeup of the star. From the definition, it is also clear that large optical depths correspond to higher rate of obscuration. Optical depth can therefore be thought of as the opacity of a medium. 

The extinction coefficient  can be calculated using the transfer equation.  In most astrophysical problems, this is exceptionally difficult to solve since solving the corresponding equations requires the incident radiation as well as the radiation leaving the star. These values are usually theoretical.

In some cases the Beer–Lambert law can be useful in finding .

It is important to note that the Beer–Lambert law is only appropriate when the absorption occurs at a specific wavelength, . For a gray atmosphere, for instance, it is most appropriate to use the Eddington Approximation.

Therefore,  is simply a constant that depends on the physical distance from the outside of a star.

The Eddington approximation and the depth of the photosphere 
Since it is difficult to define where the interior of a star ends and the photosphere begins, astrophysicists usually rely on the Eddington Approximation to derive the formal definition of 

Devised by Sir Arthur Eddington the approximation takes into account the fact that  produces a "gray" absorption in the atmosphere of a star, that is, it is independent of any specific wavelength and absorbs along the entire electromagnetic spectrum.  In that case,

This illustrates not only that the observable temperature and actual temperature at a certain physical depth of a star vary, but that the optical depth plays a crucial role in understanding the stellar structure.  It also serves to demonstrate that the depth of the photosphere of a star is highly dependent upon the absorptivity of its environment.  The photosphere extends down to a point where  is about 2/3, which corresponds to a state where a photon would experience, in general, less than 1 scattering before leaving the star.

Which is useful, for example, when  is not known but  is.

References 

Astrophysics
Scattering, absorption and radiative transfer (optics)